The Louge is a  long river in southwestern France, left tributary of the Garonne. Its source is in the département of Hautes-Pyrénées, near Lannemezan.

It flows generally north-northeast through the following départements and towns:
Hautes-Pyrénées:
Haute-Garonne: Le Fousseret, Peyssies, Lavernose-Lacasse, Muret.

It flows into the Garonne at Muret.

References

Rivers of France
Rivers of Occitania (administrative region)
Rivers of Haute-Garonne
Rivers of Hautes-Pyrénées